Talco may refer to:

 The Tajik Aluminium Company, abbreviated as TALCO
 Talco, Texas
 Talco (band)